The Harmonium Sessions is the fifth extended play (EP) by English electronic music band Ladytron. It contains unplugged versions of four songs from their 2005 studio album, Witching Hour.

It was self-released by the band as a limited edition of 500 copies. The EP comes in cardboard sleeve. On 29 March 2011, The Harmonium Sessions was released digitally by Nettwerk.

Track listing
All songs written by Ladytron.
 "International Dateline" – 4:23
 "Sugar" – 3:06
 "Destroy Everything You Touch" –  4:46
 "The Last One Standing" – 3:17

References

2006 EPs
Ladytron albums
Self-released EPs